Minto Bridge, renamed Shivaji Bridge, is a railway underbridge in New Delhi. 

Vivekananda Road, once known as Minto Road, passes under the bridge, connecting Connaught Place to the Ajmeri Gate side of the New Delhi Railway Station and Old Delhi. Journalist and chronicler RV Smith places the date of construction as 1933. AK Jain, an architect and a planner at Delhi Development Authority, places the construction to 1926. It was built to carry a new railway line to New Delhi railway station. It is now a heritage structure; this designation comes into light during plans to redevelop the area. The bridge is named after Gilbert Elliot-Murray-Kynynmound, 4th Earl of Minto who was the viceroy and governor-general of India from 1905 to 1910. It was renamed Shivaji Bridge however the old name is more commonly used. The now shut restaurants 'Blue Star' and 'Splash Bar & Restaurant' were located in its vicinity.

The underpass is known to face waterlogging since India's independence.

References 

Railway bridges in India
Bridges in Delhi
Transport in Delhi